High Ridge may refer to:

High Ridge, Maryland
High Ridge, Missouri
High Ridge Township, Jefferson County, Missouri

See also
Highridge